Francis Hodgson Nixon (1832 – 5 November 1883) was an Australian architect and newspaper owner and editor. He also wrote under the pseudonym of Peter Perfume.

Early life
Francis Hodgson Nixon was the son of Captain Nixon, Royal Navy, and received a liberal education in England.

Career
In 1846, Nixon became a pupil of the London-based Architect and Surveyor, William Wallen junior. In 1852, Nixon immigrated to Victoria where he was engaged as an architect, reportedly "having duly accredited certificates, in superintending the erection of government buildings in the Ovens—Beechworth district". Although Nixon advertised as: “Architect and Surveyor, Articled pupil of Mr. William Wallen Jnr., London and Greenwich”, his indenture agreement had been annulled, by mutual consent, on 22 June 1849.

When population settled in that goldfield he was instrumental in starting the Ovens and Murray Advertiser which he edited for some time. He then acted as secretary to the Bendigo waterworks and subsequently edited the Hamilton Spectator. He was at one time associated with the well known Mr. G. C. Levey in the conduct of the Melbourne Morning Herald. Subsequently, he edited the Wagga Wagga Advertiser. About 1879, he moved to Rockhampton, Queensland and joined the Daily Northern Argus and eventually became editor and one of the proprietors, before selling the paper to a local solicitor, Mr Lyons.

Although he had not been trained to the profession of journalism, Nixon had literary taste and culture, intelligence and enthusiasm. He had a splendid memory, and was an excellent reporter. The manner in which he reproduced the thoughts and words of speakers could only be surpassed by first-rate short-hand writers. He was well read in standard literature, and on all the great political questions of the day. His style of composition was easy and graceful, indicative of a powerful mind. Despite differences of opinion with others, there was no personal antagonism. He was earnest in his advocacy of any cause which he took up, and in his long connection with the press exercised considerable influence on the communities in which he worked.

Death
Nixon suffered from insomnia, produced from overwork in his profession as a journalist, and this was believed to be the reason he took his own life. Overwork may have also influenced his earlier decision to return to architecture. In 1881, he advertised his services in the Rockhampton Bulletin.

He committed suicide on Monday 5 November 1883 in the afternoon about four o'clock, by blowing out his brains with a pistol. After transacting some business in Rockhampton in the afternoon he hired a cab, and drove to the vicinity of Mr. W. Pattison's works, near Alligator Creek. He instructed the cabman to wait on the Rockhampton side of the bridge across the creek. Shortly after a man on the bridge heard a shot fired, and informed Mr. J. Hyland, manager of the works, who at once went to the spot. He there found Nixon lying shot through the temple with a Colt's Derringer, reclining against a tree.

Nixon died about five minutes after Mr. Hyland reached him. Mr. Nixon's remains were afterwards removed to his residence in Quay-street. He left a widow and a family of ten children, for whom general sympathy was felt. The funeral of Mr. F. H. Nixon took place on Tuesday 6 November 1884, and was attended by his friends and a number of our principal citizens, who testified to the respect they had for him by following his remains to the South Rockhampton cemetery.  The funeral service was read by the Rev. A. C. Yorke in an impressive manner.

Miscellaneous
He is the grandfather of Mona Brand.

References

Australian newspaper editors
People from Rockhampton
1832 births
1883 deaths
19th-century journalists
Male journalists
19th-century male writers